Ottal is a rural locality (a selo) in Kalyalskoye Rural Settlement, Rutulsky District, Republic of Dagestan, Russia. The population was 400 as of 2010. There are 2 streets.

Geography 
Ottal is located 48 km northwest of Rutul (the district's administrative centre) by road. Mishlesh and Muslakh are the nearest rural localities.

Nationalities 
Tsakhur people live there.

References 

Rural localities in Rutulsky District